Ricky Quade (born 26 August 1950) is a former Australian rules footballer who represented South Melbourne in the Victorian Football League (VFL). Quade later became better known as the inaugural coach of the Sydney Swans, when South Melbourne relocated to the Harbour City in 1982, and also served the club in various administrative roles.

Quade originally supported , the club that his older brothers Tom and Mike had played for, but with the advent of zoned country recruitment in late 1967, Quade would end up joining South Melbourne from Ariah Park - Mirool, New South Wales in 1970, after kicking 131 goals in the South West Football League (New South Wales) and finishing third in the SWDFL senior best and fairest medal, the Gammage Medal in 1969. 

In 1975, Quade played the first three rounds with South Melbourne then Quade and team mate Jim Prentice, both returned to Ariah Park - Mirrool as coach and assistant coach, with the team, losing the preliminary final and Prentice winning the SWDFL Gammage Medal.

Quade returned to South Melbourne and won the best and fairest award in 1976 and captained the club from 1977 to 1979 and played mainly as a ruck rover.

When South Melbourne relocated to Sydney in 1982 Quade was their inaugural coach and remained there until thirteen rounds into the 1984 season, when a severely bleeding ulcer caused him to resign. Quade had already considered it likely he would resign at the end of 1984.

References

External links

Ricky Quade's coaching record at AFL Tables

1950 births
Living people
Australian rules footballers from New South Wales
Sydney Swans players
Sydney Swans coaches
Bob Skilton Medal winners